"Centavito" is a song written and performed by American singer Romeo Santos. It was released as the sixth and final single from Santos's third studio album Golden. The music video was shot in Mexico City and released on July 21, 2018, coincidentally Santos' 37th birthday and the album's 1st anniversary of release. It features Argentine actress Eva De Dominici.

Charts

References

2017 songs
2018 singles
Romeo Santos songs
Songs written by Romeo Santos